Pokémon Ultimate Journeys: The Series is the twenty-fifth and current season of the Pokémon anime series, and the third and final season of Pokémon Journeys: The Series, known in Japan as Pocket Monsters (ポケットモンスター, Poketto Monsutā). The season premiered in Japan on TV Tokyo on December 17, 2021 and in the United States on Netflix on October 21, 2022, with new episodes to be released on February 24, 2023. In Canada, the season premiered on Teletoon on May 28, 2022 and Télétoon. This season culminates the research fellowship adventures of Ash Ketchum and Goh (sometimes accompanied by Chloe) as they travel across all eight regions, including the new Galar region from Pokémon Sword and Shield and the Galar region's Crown Tundra from Pokémon Sword and Shield: The Crown Tundra, based at Cerise Laboratory in Vermillion City in the Kanto region. Ash ascends through the ranks of the World Coronation Series and Goh continues his work with Project Mew. Four episodes released on January 21 and 28, 2022 (exclusive to Amazon Prime Video in Japan) are an arc based on the Pokémon Legends: Arceus game, with the third and fourth episodes coinciding with the release of the games. The story arc debuted on Netflix on September 23, 2022, under the name Pokémon: The Arceus Chronicles.

As announced in December 2022, this is the final season for Ash and Pikachu as main characters. The next series, premiering on April 14, 2023, will follow entirely new protagonists.

Its instrumental version serves as the ending theme.


Episode list

Notes

References

2021 Japanese television seasons
2022 Japanese television seasons
2023 Japanese television seasons
Season 25